is a Japanese post-apocalyptic manga series written and illustrated by Masatoshi Usune, serialized in Enterbrain's Comic Beam from August 1997 to October 2020. The published chapters have been collected in 22 volumes.

The manga was adapted into a 24-episode anime television series produced by Gonzo and directed by Takayuki Inagaki with character designs by Takahiro Yoshimatsu and music by Kouhei Tanaka. It aired in Japan from 4 October 2004 to 28 March 2005. Funimation has licensed the series for distribution in the United States.

Plot
After an implied global nuclear catastrophe Japan has been reduced to a desert ("The Great Kanto Desert"), and the surviving humans seek out a meager living in the hot sands. Desert Punk focuses on the adventures of a wandering mercenary named Kanta Mizuno, nicknamed Desert Punk (Sunabōzu), due to his seemingly incredible feats of skill and daring while on the job. Throughout the series, he acquires an apprentice and makes a few friends as well as many enemies.

As of 13th volume, his apprentice Taiko (also known as Kosuna) leaves his side in order to pursue her own destiny in the desert; like her former teacher, she takes a student of her own.

Characters

Protagonists

Real name , he is also known as the "Demon of the Desert". A 17-year-old member of a mercenary group known as the Handyman Guild, he has garnered a reputation as the mercenary Desert Punk. His legendary reputation is due to his good luck, practicality, intelligence, sharp wit, specialist equipment and his grandiose self-promotion. His signature weapon is a Winchester M1897 Shotgun given to him by his father that uses a variety of shotgun shells. Although thought of as a despicable person, Kanta is highly professional in accomplishing any job he is given. In volume 13, he changes sides in the civil war raging between desert oases, betraying his old friends in the hope of trading them as captives for a promotion. He offers Taiko the chance to join him, telling her that she has no trade value. She declines, and after this point, Taiko becomes the main character.
Desert Punk uses his father's old Winchester Model 1897 shotgun, along with other equipment. Enemies will often mistake his rocket-powered winch as an ability to levitate and fly. He carries a massive quantity of balloons which are identical to his outward appearance to obscure his position. He also employs smoke bombs, and has sabotage devices for his own equipment in case it is stolen.

Real name: . Kosuna is the former apprentice of the Shimmer Sniper with a goal to become the desert's number one "power babe" mercenary. After the Shimmer Sniper is lying naked and defeated, Kosuna immediately abandons him and begs to be made Kanta's apprentice. He only accepts after she shows him a picture of a large-breasted woman Kosuna claims to be her mother.
Seemingly unable to complete any task by herself at first, she is an able assistant and honestly looks up to Kanta, despite his extremely perverted ways. She is very loyal and follows orders with little or no complaints. As the series progresses, Kosuna becomes an excellent mercenary, surpassing Kanta's abilities in marksmanship even when her weapon is unfamiliar or oversized. Kosuna becomes the series' main character in volume 13, after Kanta betrays his friends and she declines his offer to switch sides with him.

Machine Gun Brothers
Childhood friends of Desert Punk. They are often seen making fun of Desert Punk, though it is implied they actually respect him. In situations where they save Desert Punk, they are seen jokingly asking if they should finish him off, with quotes such as "well, time to go kill him." Kanta attempts to betray them, along with Natsuko and Kosuna, in volume 13.
Their names are based on the seasons of winter, autumn and spring respectively, while their sister's is based on summer.

Fuyuo is the biggest of the three, and is seen giving orders occasionally. His weapon of choice is a Browning M2 .50 caliber machine gun with rifle stock and forward grip.

Akio is the second oldest brother and the biggest smart-aleck. His is seen with a weapon designated as an "M249 SAW".

The youngest brother, Haruo carries the traits of a crybaby. He is good friends with Taiko, and uses an M60 machine gun.

Others

A female rival of Desert Punk with voluptuously large breasts, she is known as the "Vixen of the Desert". She is introduced to the series in a situation where she uses her sex appeal to steal an important key from Desert Punk which he recently procured as part of a mercenary contract. Despite this and other similar actions, she remains an object of Kanta's desires, which she uses to further manipulate him. Despite often working closely together, the series never confirms if she and Desert Punk become romantically intimate.

A male rival of Desert Punk, he is depicted as an equal match for him in combat. He is renowned as a fearsome debt collector who is rumored to collect even the souls of his targets. While he has earned his reputation through forceful tactics, he is not against running away when he is at a disadvantage, however often his seeming retreats are merely feints from which he soon unexpectedly returns.

Sister of the Machine Gun Brothers, she was a childhood friend of Kanta. She is a proficient hand-to-hand combatant and the current idol of Kosuna.

Media

Manga
Desert Punk, written and illustrated by Masatoshi Usune, began serialization in Enterbrain's Comic Beam manga magazine on August 5, 1997. Twenty-two bound volumes have been released in Japan as of November 2020. In June 2020, it was revealed that Desert Punk would end in two chapters. In August 2020, it was announced that the final chapter would be published in October. On October 12, 2020, Desert Punk finished after 23 years of publication.

Anime
A 24-episode anime television series adaptation produced by Gonzo was broadcast in Japan from October 5, 2004 to March 29, 2005. In North America, Funimation acquired the series in 2005. From episodes 1-12, the first opening theme is "Sand Mission" by Hideaki Takatori while the English version is by Gary Eckert. The first ending theme is "Sunabōzu Ekaki Uta" ("How to Draw Sunabōzu") by Hideaki Takatori. From episodes 12-23, the second opening theme is "Destiny of the Desert" by Yuka while the second ending theme is # "Shinkirō" ("Mirage") by Yuka. The third opening theme is "Shinkirō" ("Mirage") by Yuka while the third ending theme is "Sand Mission" by Hideaki Takatori. The English version is by Gary Eckert.

References

External links
Funimation's official English website

1997 manga
2004 anime television series debuts
Adventure anime and manga
Anime series based on manga
Comedy anime and manga
Comics set in deserts
Enterbrain manga
Funimation
Gonzo (company)
Kadokawa Dwango franchises
Odex
Post-apocalyptic anime and manga
Seinen manga